William Edward Phillips (born 1769) was a British army officer and colonial administrator. He was acting governor of the Prince of Wales' Island on numerous occasions.

Life
He was the son of General William Phillips. He went to India in 1787, a cadet in the forces of the East India Company. In Penang in 1800, he became secretary to George Alexander William Leith, and after that to Robert Townsend Farquhar. He was then in charge until the arrival of Philip Dundas with full powers, and Phillips was at that point given a customs post.  

Further sets of circumstances then saw Phillips govern Prince of Wales' Island, in an acting capacity, which he did in total six times. They included

The death of newly arrived Lieutenant-Governor Charles Andrew Bruce, December 1810, till Archibald Seton arrived in 1811.
The death of Lieutenant-governor William Petrie in 1816 till the arrival of Colonel John Alexander Bannerman in 1817.
The death of Bannerman in 1819, until he was appointed Lieutenant-governor in 1820. 

Phillips then served as Governor of Prince of Wales' Island from 1820, frustrating the hopes for the post of Stamford Raffles.

Family
Phillips married in 1818 Janet Bannerman, daughter of Colonel John Alexander Bannerman. Their second son was the barrister Charles Palmer Phillips; and their third son was William Cornwallis Phillips of the Madras Army.

The Phillips marriage was part of a double wedding, in which Henry Burney married another Janet Bannerman. She was the daughter of the Rev. James Patrick Bannerman, brother of Colonel Bannerman.

References

Further reading
The Asiatic Annual Register, v.12 1810/1811; pp. 148–151

External links
Phillips, William Edward (fl. 1810–1826) Governor of Penang

1769 births
History of Penang
Governors of Penang
Administrators in British Penang
Date of death unknown